Radio Zet is a Polish commercial radio station.

External links
Official website

Radio stations in Poland
Mass media in Warsaw
Radio stations established in 1990
1990 establishments in Poland